Kumanovo Bus Station (Автобука Станица Куманово) is the main Bus station in Kumanovo, Macedonia. It was operated by Jug-Turist company mow by Rule Turs company.

Construction
The Station was partly renovated in 2014.

See also
Kumanovo

External links
a1on.mk Video of a Bull in the Station 27/01/2015
mrt.com.mk Video of the condition of the Bus Station Kumanovo

References

Buildings and structures in Kumanovo